Guntersblum is a former Verbandsgemeinde ("collective municipality") in the district Mainz-Bingen in Rhineland-Palatinate, Germany. The seat of the Verbandsgemeinde was in Guntersblum. On 1 July 2014 it merged into the new Verbandsgemeinde Rhein-Selz.

Municipalities 
The Verbandsgemeinde Guntersblum consisted of the following Ortsgemeinden ("local municipalities"):

 Dolgesheim 
 Dorn-Dürkheim 
 Eimsheim 
 Guntersblum
 Hillesheim 
 Ludwigshöhe 
 Uelversheim 
 Weinolsheim 
 Wintersheim

Mayors 
 1972 - 2002: Rudi Müller (CDU)
 2002 - 2009: Robert Kunnen (CDU)
 since 2009: Michael Stork (CDU)

Former Verbandsgemeinden in Rhineland-Palatinate